Jean Le Moal (30 October 1909 – 16 March 2007) was a French painter of the new Paris school, designer of stained glass windows, and one of the founder members of the Salon de Mai.

Biography

Jean Le Moal enrolled at the "Ecole des Beaux-Arts de Lyon" in 1926, and the École nationale supérieure des arts décoratifs in Paris in 1929. He also attended the "Académie Ranson" (1935–1936).

In 1939, Le Moal worked on the 1400 square meter ceiling of the French Pavilion at the International Exhibition in New York.

In 1941, Le Moal exhibited in "XX jeunes peintres de tradition française", with Bazaine, Manessier, Singier, Pignon, Gischia, and in 1943 in "Douze peintres d’aujourd’hui" at Galerie de France. In 1945, he was a founding member of the Salon de Mai.

In the post-war years Jean Le Moal became established as a prominent figure in European painting. He exhibited throughout Europe and was also awarded the "Prix de la Critique" in 1953.

Several retrospectives have been dedicated to Le Moal’s work, including at Musée de Lubeck and Musée de Wuppertal (1961), Musée de Metz and Musée de la Ville de Luxembourg (1963), Musées de Rennes, Chartres, Rouen, Dijon, Lille and Caen (1970–1971), "Espace lyonnais d'art contemporain" and Musées de Besançon, Esch-sur-Alzette, Dunkerque and Nantes (1990–1992).

Le Moal’s work is represented in many museums including
 Musée National d’Art Moderne, Paris
 Tate Modern Gallery, London
 Museum of Modern Art, Wellington, New Zealand
 Museum of Modern Art, Mexico,
 Modern Art Museum of Luxembourg
 Onstad Museum, Norway
 Museo de Arte, Chile
 Musée d’Art Contemporain, Yugoslavia
 Musée de Turin, Italy.

Selective bibliography
 Trois peintres. Le Moal, Manessier, Singier, (Camille Bourniquel), Galerie Drouin, Paris, 1946.
 Camille Bourniquel, Jean Le Moal, Le Musée de Poche, Éditions Georges Fall, Paris, 1960.
 Le Moal, (Bernard Dorival), Musées de Metz and Musée d'État, Luxembourg 1963.
 Jean Le Moal, (Gaston Diehl, Maurice Jacquemont, Michel-Georges Bernard), Musées de Rennes, Chartres, Rouen, Dijon, Lille and Caen, 1970 and 1971.
 Le Moal, (Jean Guichard-Meili), Galerie de France, Paris, 1974.
 Jean Le Moal, (Thierry Raspail, Odile Plassard, Jean-Jacques Lerrant, Michel-Georges Bernard), Espace lyonnais d'art contemporain, Lyon, Musée des Beaux-Arts et d'archéologie, Besançon, Galerie-Maison de la culture, Esch-sur-Alzette (Luxembourg), Musée d'art contemporain, Dunkerque and Château des ducs de Bretagne, Nantes, 1990–1992
 Jean Le Moal, (Francis Villadier, Alin Avila, Michel-Georges Bernard), Musée d'art et d'histoire, Meudon, 1997.
 Michel-Georges Bernard, Jean Le Moal, Éditions Ides et Calendes, Neuchâtel, 2001 (208 p.).
 Jean Le Moal, Un chemin de lumière, De chapelles en cathédrales, l'œuvre-vitrail, Musée Pierre-Noël, Saint-Dié-des-Vosges, 2008 (48 p.).

See also
 Lyrical Abstraction

External links
  Jean Le Moal, Océan, 1958–1959, Musée de Quimper, France

20th-century French painters
20th-century French male artists
French male painters
21st-century French painters
21st-century French male artists
1909 births
2007 deaths
Commandeurs of the Ordre des Arts et des Lettres